This is a list of women on death row in the United States. The number of death row inmates fluctuates daily with new convictions, appellate decisions overturning conviction or sentence alone, commutations, or deaths (through execution or otherwise). Due to this fluctuation as well as lag and inconsistencies in inmate reporting procedures across jurisdictions, the information in this article may be out of date. The time on death row counter starts on the day they were first placed on death row. It does not count time incarcerated prior to sentencing nor does it discount time spent in prison off death row in cases where death sentences were overturned before being reinstated.

Alabama

Arizona

California

Florida

Georgia

Idaho

Kentucky

Louisiana

Mississippi

North Carolina

Ohio

Oklahoma

Pennsylvania

Tennessee

Texas

See also 
 List of death row inmates in the United States
 List of women executed in the United States since 1976
 Sex differences in crime

References

External links 
 List of death row inmates by state and country
 FindLaw documentation of Nathan Dunlap's appeal to the Supreme Court of Colorado

Capital punishment in the United States
American prisoners sentenced to death
Lists of women